Leeson is a surname. Notable people with the surname include:

Bill Leeson, British filmmaker
Cecil Leeson, American musician
David Leeson, American photojournalist
Edward Leeson, British musician
John Leeson, British actor
Joseph Leeson, 1st Earl of Milltown, Irish brewer
Lynn Hershman Leeson, American filmmaker
Michael J. Leeson, American screenwriter
Nick Leeson, derivatives trader for Barings Bank
Patrick Leeson, English cricketer
Peter Leeson, American economist

Leeson is an electric motor brand name under the Regal Rexnord Corporation.

See also
Zita Leeson Weinshienk (1833-2022), American judge
Leeson Street, a thoroughfare in south Dublin, Ireland
Leason, a surname and given name